West Side Line may refer to:

West Side Line on the west side of Manhattan in New York City, serving Amtrak, and formerly part of the New York Central Railroad
IRT Broadway–Seventh Avenue Line, also called the IRT West Side Line, on the west side of Manhattan, part of the New York City Subway